The Povilas Stulga Museum of Lithuanian Folk Instruments is located in the Old Town of Kaunas, Lithuania. Its permanent collection contains Lithuanian and international musical instruments, recordings, books, placards, photographs, and letters.

Its musical instrument collection includes various versions of the kanklės, harmoniums, reeds, seven-string guitars, and a bass constructed using a table.

The museum organizes exhibitions of national art, photography, folk art, domestic tools, musical instruments, and traditional clothing. It also hosts concerts and recitals and sponsors children's music lessons and excursions.

See also 
 List of music museums

References

External links
  Istorijos fragmentai. Official website.

Museums in Kaunas
Musical instrument museums
Music organizations based in Lithuania